2,2′-Bipyridine (bipy or bpy, pronounced ) is an organic compound with the formula C10H8N2. This colorless solid is an important isomer of the bipyridine family. It is a bidentate chelating ligand, forming complexes with many transition metals. Ruthenium and platinum complexes of bipy exhibit intense luminescence, which may have practical applications.

Preparation, structure, and general properties
2,2'-Bipyridine was first prepared by decarboxylation of divalent metal derivatives of pyridine-2-carboxylate:
M(O2CC5H4N)2 → (C5H4N)2 + 2CO2  + ...

It is prepared by the dehydrogenation of pyridine using Raney nickel:

2C5H5N → (C5H4N)2 + H2

Although bipyridine is often drawn with its nitrogen atoms in cis conformation, the lowest energy conformation both in solid state and in solution is in fact coplanar, with nitrogen atoms in trans position. Monoprotonated bipyridine adopts a cis conformation.

Reactions
A large number of complexes of 2,2'-bipyridine have been described.  It binds metals as a chelating ligand, forming a 5-membered chelate ring.

See also
 2,2'-Biquinoline
 1,10-Phenanthroline

References

Chelating agents
Bipyridines